Race Life of the Aryan Peoples is a two-volume book written by Joseph Pomeroy Widney, at the time chancellor of the University of Southern California, published in New York by Funk & Wagnalls in 1907. 

Written before the era of modern genetic science, it purports to tell the history of the Aryan race, a hypothesized race which, in the late 19th and early 20th centuries, was commonly thought to exist and was regarded as descended from the original speakers of Proto-Indo European. At the time the book was published, the Aryan race was generally regarded as one of three major branches of the Caucasian race, along with the Semitic race and the Hamitic race. This approach to categorizing human population groups is now considered to be misguided and biologically meaningless.

Outline of the content of the book
Widney describes what he believed was the origin of the "Proto-Aryans" in Central Asia about 7000 years ago, and how they spread out and formed the great "Aryan empires." He included empires which were predominantly Indo-European language-speaking: The Hittite empire, Persian empire, Mauryan empire, Macedonian empire, Roman empire, Gupta empire, Spanish empire, French empire, and British empire, finally resulting in the colonization of North America by the "Aryans", with the entire process culminating in the manifest destiny of the "Aryan Americans" of the United States to establish an American Empire.

Ethnic groups traditionally regarded as included in the Aryan race 
The book also discusses the "racial characteristics" of the various subgroups of the Aryan race and their constituent ethnic groups. Widney believed that these characteristics were determined by the soil and climate of the original homeland of each subgroup or individual ethnic group. The Eastern branch, according to Widney, included the Indo-Aryans (including the Maldivians) and the Iranian peoples (including Kurds). The Western branch included the Armenians, Balts, Slavs, Romani, Albanians, Greeks, Romanics, Teutonics, Celts, Anglo-Americans (includes the European-Americans and the Anglo-Canadians), Québécois, North American White Hispanics, White Latin Americans, Anglo-Australians, Anglo-New Zealanders, British diaspora in Africa, and Boers.

Editions
 100th Anniversary edition: Race Life of the Aryan Peoples Volumes 1 and 2 (Hardcover) Kessinger Publishing (2007)

See also
 Anatolian hypothesis
 Indo-Aryan migration
 Kurgan hypothesis
 Proto-Indo-Europeans
 Indo-European migrations

References

External links 
Race Life of the Aryan Peoples Vol.1--"The Old World"--Google PDF download:
Race Life of the Aryan Peoples vol.2--"The New World"--Google PDF download:

1907 non-fiction books
Indo-European studies
Historical definitions of race
Books about race and ethnicity
Funk & Wagnalls books